WUUF (103.5 FM) is a radio station broadcasting a country music format. Licensed to Sodus, New York, United States, the station serves the Sodus area.  The station is currently owned by Waynco Radio and features programming from Westwood One's Mainstream Country format.

The station also carries radio coverage of NASCAR and the Indianapolis 500 from the three networks which provide it.

History
The station went on the air as a rock station, WNNR-FM on October 31, 1989. On May 30, 2002, the station changed its format to country and call sign to the current WUUF.

References

External links
BIG DOG 103.5 Country

UUF
Radio stations established in 1989
Country radio stations in the United States